Tonga competed at the 2022 Commonwealth Games at Birmingham, England from 28 July to 8 August 2022. Tonga made its eleventh attendance at the Games.

Sione Tupou and Kuinini Manumua were the country's flagbearers during the opening ceremony.

Competitors
The following is the list of number of competitors participating at the Games per sport/discipline.

Athletics

Men
Track and road events

Women
Field events

Boxing

Rugby sevens

As of 9 March 2022, Tonga qualified for the men's tournament. The intended Oceania qualifier (scheduled for April 2022) was cancelled, so the quota allocation was determined by Tonga's performance in the 2019 Oceania Sevens Championship.

Summary

Men's tournament
Roster
 
Walter Fifita
Sione Tupou
Samson Fualalo
Samisoni Asi
Rodney Tongotea
Niukula Osika
John Tapueluelu
John Ika
Edward Sunia
Atieli Pakalani
Amanaki Veamatahau
Latuselu Vailea
Tevita Halafihi

Pool B

Classification Quarterfinals

Classification Semifinals

Swimming

Men

Women

Weightlifting

Two weightlifters (one man, one woman) were selected on 15 April 2022.

Wrestling

References

External links
TASANOC Facebook site

2022
Nations at the 2022 Commonwealth Games
Commonwealth Games